Cue Recording was one of the first 24-track analog recording studios in the Washington, D.C., area.

The District of Columbia music scene from the 1970s through today enjoys a professional level of quality that many such studios offer locally.  Technology at Cue and other studios has evolved from vintage tape equipment to modern digital recording systems such as Pro Tools.  Throughout its 30 years producing recordings for bands, solo artists, politicians, and cable documentaries, it has seen advancements in recording technology and a degradation in industry sound requirements such as the advent of compressed digital files, i.e. mpegs, CDs, etc.

Founded by Jeff Jeffrey in 1982, Cue began recording bands and commercial narrations in a basement studio located in Falls Church, Virginia. In 1987, Jeffrey leased 3500 square feet of space in a commercial building where the next phase Cue began. Today, this building still continues to be Cue's home with the expansion to 5500 square feet, housing six of its studios.

Cue has achieved many accomplishments since its inception.  It has been awarded 10 gold and platinum awards for tracking and mixing major label recordings, received three Wammies for Best Studio in the DC area, an Innovative Technology award from Falls Church City, a mid Atlantic Best Studio award from Music Monthly Magazine, and contributed to several Grammy awarded recordings.

Cue created its sister enterprise in 2001, Cue Studios Center for Audio Engineering.  A Virginia state certified postsecondary school, "CSCAE" offers "one on one" and group audio engineering training to its students.

External links
 

Recording studios in the United States